The Scottish Qualifications Authority (SQA; Gaelic: Ùghdarras Theisteanas na h-Alba)  is the executive non-departmental public body of the Scottish Government responsible for accrediting educational awards. It is partly funded by the Education and Lifelong Learning Directorate of the Scottish Government, and employs approximately 750 staff based in Glasgow and Dalkeith.

SQA is best known for the delivery of the annual diet of public examinations within Scotland for school pupils. SQA Higher examinations are the general acceptable level for entry to university, with Scottish universities usually requesting a minimum of 3 Highers, all above C level. However, a greater number of candidates of all ages participate in SQA specialist, vocational and higher education qualifications. SQA is accredited by the UK government to offer educational qualifications.

On 21 June 2021 it was announced that the SQA would be replaced following a review by the OECD. Despite such announcements, the SQA continues to function for the academic year 2021-2022 and, as announced 9 March 2022, the authority will not be replaced until 2024.

History 
The SQA's functions and responsibilities are laid out in the Education (Scotland) Act 1996 as amended by the Scottish Qualifications Authority Act 2002. Until their merger, the two major Scottish examination authorities were the Scottish Examination Board (SEB) and the Scottish Vocational Education Council (SCOTVEC). The former issued the school-level examinations, then called Standard Grade, Higher Grade and Certificate of Sixth Year Studies (CSYS). A legacy of its two precursor bodies, the Authority's offices remain split over two sites, one in Glasgow and one in Dalkeith.

Under a major reform of Scottish exams (the National Qualifications or "Higher Still" reforms), the CSYS was replaced with a broadly equivalent qualification called Advanced Higher. Some curriculum changes were also made to the Higher grade at this time. The introduction of the reformed examinations system was criticised in the press and by the government after a series of administrative and computer errors led to several thousand incorrect Higher and Intermediate certificates being sent out. The crisis took several months to resolve, and several management figures, including the Chief Executive Ron Tuck, resigned or were fired.

Scottish Candidate Number
The Scottish Candidate Number (SCN) (formerly SCOTVEC number) is allocated to pupils at school and in further-education colleges who undertake Scottish Qualifications Authority (formerly SCOTVEC or Scottish Examination Board) courses.

Qualification types 
SQA has a statutory responsibility to provide public examinations for Scottish state schools, though these are also used more widely. It has a statutory responsibility to accredit vocational qualifications (that is formally scrutinise them and confirm that they conform to agreed UK criteria). None of its qualifications, still less its vocational qualifications, is protected by statute, but the Authority has a largely dominant position within all sectors of qualifications within Scotland. SQA awards are also exported to a number of countries including China, Africa, the Middle East, Russia and former Soviet republics and other countries. SQA also provides the licensing certification for many merchant navies throughout the world.

National Qualifications 
A National Qualification (NQ) can take the form of Standard Grades or National Courses.

Standard Grades have been in existence before the Higher Still reforms. There are three Standard Grade Levels: Foundation, General and Credit. They are normally set at age 14–15 (sometimes at age 16 for students whose birthdays are before May), usually when attending High School.

National Courses were introduced with the "Higher Still" reforms. There are seven National Courses: National 1, National 2, National 3, National 4, National 5, Higher, Advanced Higher. National Courses can be taken in a wide range of subjects, from the purely academic, such as English and Mathematics—to the purely vocational, such as Accounting and Mental Health Care. They combine three National Units, each lasting 40 hours with a Course Assessment, normally taken at the end of a one-year Course in the early summer.

In addition to traditional National Qualification Courses, a new suite of "pre-vocational" courses entitled "Skills for Work" was rolled out.  Primarily available at Intermediate 1 and Intermediate 2 levels, these prevocational courses, aim to give students an awareness of the workplace environment, the skills required for entry to an industry as well as generic employment skills. Each of these Courses is awarded on the Scottish Qualifications Certificate.

Many faculties that provide SQA National Courses also provide preliminary examinations, or prelim exams. These usually take place in January or February.

Reorganization of National Qualifications 

According to SQA, all National Qualifications will be redesigned as follows in the future:

According to the SQA, the new qualifications have "more focus on skills development compared to the existing qualifications ... There is also a greater emphasis on 'deeper learning' by helping learners to think for themselves; to apply and interpret the knowledge and understanding they have developed and to demonstrate the skills they have learned."

National 1-4 will be assessed internally by the student's own institution, subject to regulation by the SQA. National 5 courses and above will also have a number of internal assessments, followed by an externally marked exam.

National Assessment Bank 
Since the introduction of Highers, Intermediate 1 and Intermediate 2 courses, the SQA have also introduced a National Assessment Bank of short examinations for each subject. These are more commonly known as NABs or unit assessments, and contain questions from specific academic units at a basic level. Each candidate must pass a certain number of NABs (usually three) before they can be presented for the final examination, although resits can occur with other NAB materials.

The National Assessment Bank materials are available for download as Word or PDF files on a secure SQA website. The only person who can enter the site is the SQA coordinator of each institution. 
For national 4 and 5 courses NABs are usually taken 3 times throughout the session when units have been completed and appear on the candidates certificate as a unit pass even if the candidate does not pass the whole course e.g. "No award in national 5 english but passed a unit internally."

Release of results 

Students for National Qualifications receive their results on, generally, the first Tuesday in August. Students signed up for the authority's MySQA system are able to check their record online throughout the year and get their exam results by text and/or email on the day that the results are issued. Those signed up to the service received their results one day earlier than the official postal results. This also occurred in subsequent years, however only due to a mistake by the company holding the results. In another incident, the SQA itself sent the results out on the right day, but Robert Gordon University's business school leaked whether students had been let in, and a technical error with St Andrew's University's website also leaked the results of applicants.

Due to the high volume of exam marking with the Scottish examination boards and those across the rest of the UK, where it is thought that exam marking inaccuracies may occur, there are each year a vast number of students requesting for an exam "re-mark". After the SQA introduced fees (which were exorbitant in many students' and parents' opinion), requests for exam remarking plummeted 55,000 students—a decline of 77%.

In order to fight (supposed) grade inflation within the Scottish education sector; SQA has introduced academically and cognitively more rigorous examination standards and stricter marking; this has resulted in strong criticism towards the SQA exam board and in decreases of exam pass rates of up to 15%.

National units and programmes 
There are the many qualifications often imperfectly referred to as  vocational, though these are frequently stepping-stones for students at Scottish Colleges of Further Education to pursue one- or two- year programmes tailored from a wide-ranging catalogue of National Units. The actual programme may be very rigidly prescribed by employers or be entirely freely chosen by the student to meet particular needs. The prescribed programmes may be recognised by a National Certificate or a Scottish Progression Award.

SVQs and modern apprenticeships 
Scottish Vocational Qualifications (SVQ) are an award for vocational education and training awarded by the SQA or other approved awarding bodies in conjunction with industry bodies.  Scottish National Qualifications and Scottish Progression Awards are often important in a Modern Apprenticeship scheme along with SVQs. SVQs are developed by United Kingdom employers in tandem with National Vocational Qualifications (NVQ) for England, Wales and Northern Ireland.

SVQ are assessed in the workplace (or closely regulated training workshops) by employers, training providers or colleges approved and monitored by the SQA (or other awarding bodies) accredited by its independent Accreditation Unit.

Higher National Certificates and Diplomas 
Qualifications aimed at students in their first two years of Higher Education include HNCs (Higher National Certificates)—taken as a one-year full-time course or as a two-year part-time course—and HNDs (Higher National Diplomas). These qualifications are extremely popular in colleges, workplaces and community education centres in Scotland, the rest of the UK and throughout the world.

Students with disabilities 
These include specific qualifications for those with severe to moderate difficulties (Access), the right to aid in completing assessments (for example, a scribe) and the right to challenge any unfair or artificial barrier in the rules for any qualification.

English as a second language 
There is a suite of National Units addressing the needs of economic migrants, asylum seekers and (the biggest group) those seeking to master English before returning to their own countries.  It has also developed qualifications for those seeking to teach English to refugees.

Partnerships 
SQA is one of the four partner national organisations involved in the Curriculum for Excellence. It works with partners on all strands of the development. Its principal role is to contribute to work on qualifications and assessment. SQA's role in Curriculum for Excellence is to design and develop the new qualifications and assessment.

SQA has joined with Universities Scotland, QAA Scotland and the Scottish Government to create the Scottish Credit and Qualifications Framework or SCQF. Every Scottish qualification—from the Access level for those with learning difficulties to a Doctorate and including vocational as well as ESOL and BSL qualifications—is allocated a level and credit value within this framework, which all partners have agreed to recognise.

Controversy

2015 Higher Maths exam
The Higher Maths exam sat by students in May 2015 was said to be far too difficult. This evoked heated debates among students, teachers and educationalists; the corresponding grade boundaries for the respective exam were thus adjusted accordingly, with a pass mark as low as 34%. The SQA later admitted that one of their Higher Maths exam papers had been unusually hard and unfit for purpose.

2016 exams
Several exams that were set from the SQA in 2016 were criticised by pupils, parents, teachers and MSPs.

National 5 Maths exam
The National 5 Maths exam, sat on 12 May 2016, in particular Paper 1 (non-calculator), was also criticised by students after being considered much more difficult than previous years. A petition was created by students which was to be sent to the SQA demanding to know why the exam was exceedingly difficult, and it gained over 25,000 signatures.

National 5 Computing Science exam
Scottish Green MSP, Ross Greer criticised the SQA for mistakes in the National 5 Computing Science exam and called for an investigation into the exam, he defended teachers and students who thought that this was the worst exam ever set by the SQA. The SQA later admitted that the exam had mistakes.

2018 exams

National 5 History exam 
The SQA faced criticism for the 2018 National 5 History exam as the wrong date was given for the execution of Mary, Queen of Scots. While the SQA insist their mistake did not disadvantage any pupil, teachers disagree saying that the mistake meant that pupils second guessed their knowledge. The mistake was criticised by many including historian Tom Devine, who called the error "unacceptable".

2019 exams
Certain exams set by SQA in 2019 have received widespread criticism from pupils, parents, and teaching staff within schools and colleges.

National 5 and Higher Biology and Human Biology exams
The National 5 and Higher Biology and Human Biology exams, which took place on 30 April 2019, received criticism from candidates on social media, and featured on national news. They claimed they bore no resemblance to previous papers, and relied too heavily on problem solving and mathematics skills as opposed to biology content. A petition was created by pupils, demanding that the pass mark be lowered. SQA defended the examinations, claiming that they were fair tests of the subject.

2020 exams
Due to the coronavirus pandemic, the SQA cancelled the 2020 exam diet. This was the first time in SQA's history that all exams were cancelled. Grades were given based on results in preliminary examinations and predicted grades from teachers.

After pupils received their results on 4 August, it emerged that the SQA had moderated downwards 124,000 grades from up to 75,000 pupils. This received criticism from candidates, teachers and politicians in all political parties in Scotland.

The subsequent criticism was heavily featured on social media and national news.

On 11 August, it was subsequently announced during an emergency statement by the Scottish education secretary that the SQA would reverse all downgraded results, while leaving upwards moderated results in situ. The change's resulting unprecedented increase in year-on-year performance was said to be 'outweighed' by the concerns of those affected and the loss of faith in the system.

2021 exams 
On 7 October 2020, due to the ongoing coronavirus pandemic, the SQA announced that the National 5 exams for 2021 were to be cancelled, but Highers and Advanced Highers would still go ahead. However, on 8 December 2020, Scottish Education Secretary John Swinney announced that the Highers and Advanced Highers would also be cancelled, meaning all SQA exams in 2021 would not go ahead, with grades for all levels being decided instead by teacher judgement.

2022 exams 
After announcing in February 2022, that exams would be shifting to 'Scenario 2'. On 7 March 2022, the SQA's guidance on the 2022 exams were leaked via Twitter. The content of the guidance was described as "woefully inadequate" and in many cases provided no clarification for what to expect in an exam paper.

References

External links 
 

Education in Scotland
 
Organisations based in Glasgow
Qualification awarding bodies in the United Kingdom
School examinations
Qualifications Authority
Qualifications Authority
Higher education in Scotland
Vocational education in Scotland
Educational institutions established in 1997
1997 establishments in Scotland